Acmonia or Akmonia is an ancient city of Phrygia Pacatiana, in Asia Minor, now known as Ahat Köyü in the district of Banaz, Uşak Province. It is mentioned by Cicero (Pro Flacco, 15) and was a point on the road between Dorylaeum and Philadelphia. Under the Romans, it was within the conventus iuridicus of Apamea.

Bishopric 

Acmonia was the seat of a bishop in antiquity. It appears in the Notitiae Episcopatuum from the 10th to the 12th or 13th century. The first bishop whose name is known is Optimus, who was transferred to the metropolitan see of Antiochia in Pisidia before 381. Gennadius took part in the Council of Chalcedon in 451. Theotimus signed in 459 the decree of Patriarch Gennadius I of Constantinople against the simoniacs. Paulus was at the Second Council of Nicaea in 787. Eustathius was a both the Council of Constantinople (869) and the Council of Constantinople (879). Somewhat less certain is the attribution to this diocese of Basilius, who participated in the Third Council of Constantinople in 680. He is recorded as bishop of Κολωνία Πακατιανή (Colonia of the province of Pacatiana) but, as there is no record of such a diocese, it is thought that Κολωνία is a mistake for Ἀκμωνία (Acmonia). No longer a residential bishopric, Acmonia is today listed by the Catholic Church as a titular see.

Excavations 

In 2000, a large mosaic floor depicting a gymnasium was discovered in Acmonia. Despite the emergency excavations, which started on 26 June 2000, one part of the mosaic was stolen from the excavation site. The stolen parts were later recovered in Istanbul after a police raid in 2002.

See also
 List of titular sees

References 
Notes

Sources
Nezih Başgelen, "Çalınan Geçmiş, Yitirilen Miras. Akmoneia (Ahatköy) Mozaikleri." Arkeoloji ve Sanat 22(2000).97: 23-25.

Further reading
 Ramsay, W. M. "The Cities and Bishoprics of Phrygia." The Journal of Hellenic Studies 4 (1883): 370-436. doi:10.2307/623380.
 THONEMANN, PETER. "The Women of Akmoneia." The Journal of Roman Studies 100 (2010): 163-78.  www.jstor.org/stable/41724770.

External links
"Ancient Akmonia to be protected", Turkish Daily News May 19, 2005

History of Uşak
Populated places in Phrygia
Former populated places in Turkey
Byzantine sites in Anatolia
Populated places in Banaz District
Catholic titular sees in Asia